Isfandiyār Khān Bēg, was the Mughal faujdar of Sylhet Sarkar from 1663 to 1665.

Early life
Isfandiyar's father was Mirza Allah Yar Khan (also spelt Ilahyar, Allahyar or Ilah Yar) and his grandfather was Iftikhar Khan Turkmen (also known as Iftiyar), both of whom took part in Islam Khan I's battle at Daulambapur, South Sylhet against Khwaja Usman in 1612. Iftiyar died in this battle. Emperor Jahangir granted jagir to Allah Yar Khan, who died in 1650.

Career

Following Mir Jumla II's conquest of Cooch Behar, Isfandiyar Beg was put in charge of governing the area and defeated the previous ruler, Pran Narayan. According to a sanad from Dhar Chowdhury of Pailgaon, Isfandiyar Beg had revenues in Sylhet in 1658.

Isfandiyar Khan succeeded Lutfullah Shirazi as Faujdar of Sylhet in 1663. Isfandiyar was known to have destroyed the Adina Mosque replica in Sylhet town because the imam started Eid al-Adha prayers without waiting for him. However, after its destruction, Isfandiyar attempted to build another mosque in Dargah Mahalla.  The ruins of this mosque can be seen today, behind the trees near the Dargah Gateway. Isfandiyar also officially recognised Shaykh Pir Bakhsh as the rightful khadim (guardian) of Shah Jalal's dargah, a descendant of Haji Muhammad Yusuf who was the dargah's first guardian.

Isfandiyar granted land to Shah Kamal Estate of Durmut in Jamalpur. Khan was succeeded by Syed Ibrahim Khan in 1665.

See also
History of Sylhet

References

|-

Rulers of Sylhet
Mughal princes
17th-century Indian monarchs
17th-century Indian Muslims